The Caribbean Netherlands are the three public bodies of the Netherlands that are located in the Caribbean Sea. They consist of the islands of Bonaire, Sint Eustatius and Saba, although the term "Caribbean Netherlands" is sometimes used to refer to all of the islands in the Dutch Caribbean. In legislation, the three islands are also known as Bonaire, Sint Eustatius and Saba or the BES islands (an acronym of their names). The islands are currently classified as public bodies in the Netherlands and as overseas countries and territories of the European Union; thus, EU law does not automatically apply.

Bonaire (including the islet of Klein Bonaire) is one of the Leeward Antilles and is located close to the coast of Venezuela. Sint Eustatius and Saba are in the main Lesser Antilles group and are located south of Sint Maarten and northwest of Saint Kitts and Nevis. The Caribbean Netherlands has a population of 25,157 as of January 2019.

Legal status 
The three islands gained their current status following the dissolution of the Netherlands Antilles on 10 October 2010. At the same time, the islands of Curaçao and Sint Maarten became autonomous countries within the Kingdom of the Netherlands. The island of Aruba is also a constituent country of the Kingdom located in the Caribbean. The term "Dutch Caribbean" may refer to the three special municipalities (e.g. for stamps), but may also refer to all of the Caribbean islands within the Kingdom of the Netherlands. These figures are not consistent with the table below.

In 2012, the islands of the Caribbean Netherlands voted for the first time, due to being special municipalities of the Kingdom of the Netherlands, in the 2012 Dutch general election.

Administration 

The special municipalities carry many of the functions normally performed by Dutch municipalities. The executive power rests with the Governing Council headed by an Island governor. The main democratic body is the island council. Dutch citizens of these three islands are entitled to vote in Dutch national  elections and (as all Dutch nationals) in European elections.

Officially the islands are classed in Dutch law as being  (literally translated as "public bodies") and not  (municipalities). Unlike normal municipalities, they do not form part of a Dutch province and the powers normally exercised by provincial councils within municipalities are divided between the island governments themselves and the central government by means of the National Office for the Caribbean Netherlands. For this reason, they are called "special" municipalities.

Many Dutch laws make special provisions for the Caribbean Netherlands. For example, social security is not on the same level as it is in the European Netherlands.

National Office 

The National Office for the Caribbean Netherlands is responsible for taxation, policing, immigration, transport infrastructure, health, education, and social security in the islands and provides these services on behalf of the Government of the Netherlands. This agency was established as the Regional Service Center in 2008 and became the National Office for the Caribbean Netherlands on 1 September 2010. The current director is Jan Helmond. The Representative for the public bodies of Bonaire, Sint Eustatius and Saba represents the Government of the Netherlands on the islands and also performs tasks similar to a King's Commissioner. The current representative is Gilbert Isabella.

Relationship with the European Union 

The islands do not form part of the European Union and instead constitute "overseas countries and territories" (OCT status) of the Union, to which special provisions apply. The Lisbon Treaty introduced a procedure where the European Council may change the status of an overseas territory of Denmark, France, or the Netherlands regarding the application of the EU treaties to that territory. In June 2008, the Dutch government published a survey of the legal and economic impacts by a switched status from OCT to outermost region (OMR). The position of the islands was reviewed after a five-year transitional period, which began with the dissolution of the Netherlands Antilles in October 2010. The review was conducted as part of the planned review of the Dutch "Act for the public bodies Bonaire, Sint Eustatius and Saba", where the islands have been granted the option to become an OMR – and thus a direct part of the European Union. In October 2015, the review concluded the present legal structures for governance and integration with European Netherlands was not working well within the framework of WolBES, but no recommendations were made in regards of whether a switch from OCT to OMR status would help improve this situation.

Foreign policy and defence 
The Kingdom of the Netherlands has overarching responsibility for foreign relations, defence and Dutch nationality law in the Caribbean parts of the Kingdom. Units of the Netherlands Armed Forces deployed in the Caribbean include: 

 32 Infantry Company of the Royal Netherlands Marine Corps on Aruba;
 a Marine Corps detachment on St Maarten;
 a Fast Raiding Interception and Special Forces Craft (FRISC) troop (fast boats) on Curaçao and Aruba;
 a company of the Royal Netherlands Army on Curaçao on a rotational basis;
 a guardship, normally a Holland-class offshore patrol vessel, from the Royal Netherlands Navy on station on a rotational basis;
 the Royal Netherlands Navy support vessel HNLMS Pelikaan;
 Arumil (Aruban) and Curmil (Curaçaoan) militia elements;
 a Netherlands Armed Forces Royal Marechaussee brigade.

Additionally, the Dutch Caribbean Coast Guard is funded by the four countries of the Kingdom of the Netherlands. The Coast Guard is managed by the Ministry of Defence and is directed by the commander of the Royal Netherlands Navy in the Caribbean.

Geography 
The Caribbean Netherlands form part of the Lesser Antilles. Within this island group:

 Bonaire is part of the ABC islands within the Leeward Antilles island chain off the Venezuelan coast. The Leeward Antilles have a mixed volcanic and coral origin.
 Saba and Sint Eustatius are part of the SSS islands. They are located east of Puerto Rico and the Virgin Islands. Although in the English language they are usually described as being part of the Leeward Islands, in French, Spanish, Dutch and the English spoken locally, they are considered to be part of the Windward Islands. The Windward Islands are all of volcanic origin and hilly, leaving little ground suitable for agriculture. The highest point is Mount Scenery, on Saba (also the highest point in all the Kingdom of the Netherlands).

Climate 
The islands of the Caribbean Netherlands enjoy a tropical climate with warm weather all year round. The Leeward Antilles are warmer and drier than the Windward islands. In summer, the Windward Islands can be subject to hurricanes.

Currency 
Until 1 January 2011, the three islands used the Netherlands Antillean guilder; after that all three switched to the U.S. dollar, rather than the euro (which is used in the European Netherlands) or the Caribbean guilder (which is being adopted by the other two former Antillean islands of Curaçao and Sint Maarten).

Communications 
The telephone country code remains 599, that of the former Netherlands Antilles, and is shared with Curaçao.  The International Organization for Standardization has assigned the ISO 3166-1 alpha-2 country code ISO 3166-2:BQ for these islands. The IANA has not established a root zone for the .bq Internet ccTLD and whether it will be used is unknown.

See also 

 2010 Bonaire constitutional referendum
 Identity cards of Bonaire, Sint Eustatius and Saba
 ISO 3166-2:BQ, the ISO codes for the subdivisions of the Caribbean Netherlands
 Postage stamps and postal history of the Caribbean Netherlands

Notes

References

External links 

 Official website of the National Office for the Caribbean Netherlands
 Official website of the government of Bonaire
 Official website of the government of Saba
 Official website of the government of St. Eustatius

 

.
 
Integral overseas territories
Islands of the Netherlands
Leeward Islands (Caribbean)
Subdivisions of the Netherlands
Municipalities of the Netherlands established in 2010
2010s establishments in the Caribbean
2010 establishments in North America